Drummond Community High School  (DCHS) is a non-denominational secondary school built originally in 1925 by John Alexander Carfrae which serves the area of north east Edinburgh. Drummond Community High School is on Bellevue Place and was originally known as Bellevue Junior Secondary School. The catchment area serves an area to the east of the city including the southern areas of Leith, Hillside, Abbeyhill, Broughton and Bellevue. In addition to the school roll of 352, the school provides places for over 400 adult day learners and approximately 400 adult learners.

References 

Drummond Community High School's page on Scottish Schools Online
http://www.scran.ac.uk/database/record.php?usi=000-000-035-489 
http://canmore.rcahms.gov.uk/en/site/149511/

External links
Official School Website

Secondary schools in Edinburgh
Educational institutions established in 1925
1925 establishments in Scotland